Osiris Therapeutics, Inc.  was founded in March 1993 following the identification of mesenchymal stem cells (MSCs) by Dr. Arnold Caplan and colleagues at Case Western Reserve University in Cleveland Ohio. This was years before Geron and Advanced Cell Sciences appeared and garnered massive public attention for their stem cell work.  Dr. Caplan contributed a license to the technology and joined Kevin Kimberlin, James S. Burns, a biotech venture capitalist, and Peter Friedli, a "high-tech financier" and lead investor, to launch Osiris; Caplan and Burns had named the company after the Egyptian god of the "lower world".  Early financing was provided by a number of entities, including Three Arch Bay Health Sciences Fund of Mountain View, California, Burns and a New York-based acquaintance of Burns.  Almost immediately the company tried launching an initial public offering (IPO), but the petition was withdrawn due to low investor interest.  By 1994, the state of Maryland had determined that they wanted Osiris to be based in their state, and state officials engineered a loan and equity investment which successfully lured the company from Ohio by 1995.

A peer company, StemCells, emerged in 1995 in California with a focus on neural regeneration, but using stem cell technology emerging from the laboratory of Irving Weissman at Stanford University.

The year 1997 saw the start of a multi-million dollar research and licensing arrangement with Novartis, which initially acquired 8% of the company of 65 employees, around stem cell treatments for bone and cartilage disorders, including underwriting the cost of clinical trials, an arrangement that lasted until at least 1999.  At the time, osteoporosis and arthritis were the top targets of Novartis research.  Also around this time Osiris only direct competitor was a unit of Novartis, Systemix, in the area of stem cell treatments for cancer, which was outside the scope of the deal Osiris had struck with Novartis.  Also, at the time the Novartis deal was struck, Osiris held a majority stak in Gryphon, a blood stem cell technology exploitation firm spun out of Johns Hopkins Medical School.

The company's first chief executive officer (CEO) was co-founder James Burns, who held the position from the company's inception through at least 1999.  The company's Chief Financial Officer around this time was Michael Demchuk Jr.

By 2002, morale among staff was low due to frequent management turnover and a court battle between a co-founder and a lead investor; that year the company's fourth CEO came on board, veteran biotech executive William H. Pursley.  Further, the company was having financial difficulties, alongside peers Geron and Advanced Cell Sciences.  Four years later, in 2006 when the company had 83 employees, Osiris began trading as OSIR on NASDAQ, having offered up 13% of the company as shares and raising $38.5 million, with funds intended for loan servicing and clinical trial expenses.  However, the company continued its trend of rapid executive turnover as a new CEO was onboard for the IPO, I. Richard Garr.  Garr was a co-founder and one time CEO of NeuralStem Biopharmaceuticals.  There was yet another CEO transition either preceding or following installation of Garr, as C. Randall Mills was noted in one report as CEO in the 2006-2007 timeframe.  At the time of the IPO, Osiris was considered to be "the closest in (the United States) to bringing a pure stem cell product to market", and had a marketed drug in the form of the bone regeneration treatment Osteocel.  The company divested Osteocel to NuVasive in 2009.

Osiris received the first regulatory clearance in the world for a systemically administered stem cell drug, called Prochymal or remestemcel-L. In 2013, Osiris sold its MSC drug and patents to Mesoblast of Australia and the drug was renamed Ryoncil.  Osiris had spent more than two decades working on this product, but divestment, and the proceeds therefrom, would allow the company to move on with other projects.

Osiris struggled to transition from product research to commercialization and defended against a number of investor lawsuits around 2015; and the resignation of the CEO, Lode Debrabandere, in 2016 seemed to puncutate the firm's troubles, though Debrabandere cited personal reasons as his motivation.  The company's chief business officer, Dwayne Montgomery, assumed an interim CEO role.  Montgomery was subsequently confirmed as CEO.  By June 2016, a new interim CEO, David Dresner, had been named, who served until July 2017 when Linda Palczuk, formerly of AstraZeneca, was confirmed as CEO.  In March 2017, shares of Osiris were delisted from the NASDAQ stock exchange as the company failed to meet the exchange's requirements, including failure to file an annual report, after being granted additional time for compliance.

The company was relisted on the NASDAQ in August 2018.

In 2019, Osiris was acquired by Smith & Nephew plc, a global medical technology business.  By this time, the company had 360 employees, all of whom were expected to remain with the firm, which would operate as a subsidiary to its parent.

Ryoncil was tested in a March 2020 pilot study at Mount Sinai Hospital in New York City on late-stage, ventilator-assisted Covid-19 patients suffering Acute Respiratory Distress Syndrome. Based on the results, the FDA approved a Phase 2/3 study on 300 patients at 30 sites around the U.S. The Cardiothoracic Surgical Trials Network, funded by the National Institutes of Health, and Mesoblast (the owner of the product) commenced that trial on May 5, 2020.

Publications 
Affiliation of all authors was with Osiris unless otherwise noted.

 
 This article includes description of the adult stem cell harvesting method that provided Osiris a competitive advantage over other firms in being able to productively support clinical trials.

References

Regenerative biomedicine
Health care companies based in Maryland
Pharmaceutical companies established in 1992